The 2012 Aberto de Florianópolis was a professional tennis tournament played on hard courts. It was the fifth edition of the tournament which was part of the 2012 ATP Challenger Tour. It took place in Florianópolis, Brazil between February 27 and March 4, 2012.

Singles main-draw entrants

Seeds

 Rankings are as of February 20, 2012.

Other entrants
The following players received wildcards into the singles main draw:
  Martín Cuevas
  Tiago Fernandes
  Bruno Sant'anna
  João Pedro Sorgi

The following players received entry from the qualifying draw:
  Leonardo Kirche
  Christian Lindell
  Thiago Monteiro
  Fernando Romboli

Champions

Singles

 Simone Bolelli def.  Blaž Kavčič, 6–3, 6–4

Doubles

 Blaž Kavčič /  Antonio Veić def.  Javier Martí /  Leonardo Tavares, 6–3, 6–3

External links
ITF Search
ATP official site

Aberto de Florianopolis
Aberto de Florianópolis
Cyc